The 1963 NBA playoffs were the postseason tournament of the National Basketball Association's 1962-63 season. The tournament concluded with the Eastern Division champion Boston Celtics defeating the Western Division champion Los Angeles Lakers 4 games to 2 in the NBA Finals.

The Celtics won their 5th straight and 6th overall, NBA title. Boston defeated L.A. in the NBA Finals for the second straight year, something that happened regularly in the 1960s.

The Cincinnati Royals advanced to the Division Finals for the first time since 1952, extending the Celtics to seven games.

This was the last playoff appearance for the Syracuse Nationals under that name; they moved to Philadelphia, Pennsylvania the following season and became known as the Philadelphia 76ers.

This was the first time that both Division Finals series went to a deciding Game 7, and will be the last until 1979 and again until 2018.

Bracket

Division Semifinals

Eastern Division Semifinals

(2) Syracuse Nationals vs. (3) Cincinnati Royals

This was the first playoff meeting between these two teams.

Western Division Semifinals

(2) St. Louis Hawks vs. (3) Detroit Pistons

This was the third playoff meeting between these two teams, with both teams splitting the first two meetings.

Division Finals

Eastern Division Finals

(1) Boston Celtics vs. (3) Cincinnati Royals

This was the first playoff meeting between these two teams.

Western Division Finals

(1) Los Angeles Lakers vs. (2) St. Louis Hawks

This was the sixth playoff meeting between these two teams, with the Hawks winning four of the first five meetings.

NBA Finals: (E1) Boston Celtics vs. (W1) Los Angeles Lakers

This was the third playoff meeting between these two teams, with the Celtics winning the first two meetings.

See also
1963 NBA Finals
1962-63 NBA season

References

External links
Basketball-Reference.com's 1963 NBA Playoffs page

National Basketball Association playoffs
Playoffs